is a railway station in the city of Tendō, Yamagata, Japan, operated by East Japan Railway Company (JR East).

Lines
Tendō Station is served by the Ōu Main Line and the Yamagata Shinkansen, and is located  rail kilometers from the terminus of both lines at Fukushima Station.

Station layout
The station is an elevated station with one side platform and one island platform, serving three tracks. The station has a Midori no Madoguchi staffed ticket office.

Platforms

History
Tendō Station opened on 23 August 1901. The station was absorbed into the JR East network upon the privatization of JNR on 1 April 1987. A new station building was completed in September 1992. The Yamagata Shinkansen began operations from 4 December 1999.

Passenger statistics
In fiscal 2018, the station was used by an average of 1,463 passengers daily (boarding passengers only). The passenger figures for previous years are as shown below.

Surrounding area
The station is in the heart of Tendō with the bus station and shops adjacent.
 Tendō City Hall
 Tendō post office
 Hiroshige Art Museum
 Tendō Shogi Museum
 Tendō onsen

References

External links

 JR East Station information 

Stations of East Japan Railway Company
Yamagata Shinkansen
Railway stations in Yamagata Prefecture
Ōu Main Line
Railway stations in Japan opened in 1901
Tendō, Yamagata